Józef Marian Chełmoński (November 7, 1849 – April 6, 1914) was a Polish painter of the realist school with roots in the historical and social context of the late Romantic period in partitioned Poland. He is famous for monumental paintings now at the Sukiennice National Art Gallery in Kraków and at the MNW in Warsaw.

Life
Chełmoński was born in the village of Boczki near Łowicz in central Congress Poland under the Russian military control. His first drawing teacher was his father Józef Adam (a small leaseholder and administrator of Boczki village). His mother was Izabela née Łoskowska. After finishing high school in Warsaw, Józef studied in Warsaw Drawing Class (1867–1871) and took private lessons from Wojciech Gerson. From 1871 to 1874 Chełmoński lived in Munich. He worked with Polish painters assembled around Jozef Brandt and Maksymilian Gierymski. There, he also studied for a few months at the academy of H. Anschutz and A. Strahuber. In 1872 and 1874 Chełmoński visited the Polish Territories (Poland, as an independent country, did not exist during this time), Tatra Mountains and Ukraine.

His first paintings were done under the influence of Gerson. The works that followed were landscapes and villages. In 1875 Chełmoński went to Paris, where he had many important exhibitions and became known to the art scene. With many orders, the artistic level of his paintings decreased.

From 1878 to 1887 Chełmoński visited Poland, Vienna and Venice. In 1887 he returned to Poland and in 1889 settled in the village of Kuklówka Zarzeczna. Contact with his homeland and nature are qualities revealed in his artworks. From that time are the best liked, or the most beloved of Chełmoński's paintings are paintings such as Partridge on the Snow, The Storks or Before Thunderstorm.

Chełmoński represented the trend in art called "Polish Patriotic Painting". He died in Kuklówka near Grodzisk Mazowiecki in 1914.

Selected works

References

Józef Chełmoński  
Paintings

Bibliography
Maciej Masłowski: Malarski żywot Józefa Chełmońskiego (Józef Chełmoński Painter's Life),Warsaw 1965, ed. "PIW" (ed.National Publishing Institute, 2nd edition - 1972);
Maciej Masłowski: Józef Chełmoński, Warsaw 1973, ed. „Auriga” - Wydawnictwa Artystyczne i Filmowe (Art and Film Publishers).

External links
 

1849 births
1914 deaths
19th-century Polish painters
19th-century Polish male artists
20th-century Polish painters
20th-century Polish male artists
Equine artists
Polish male painters